Arhopala myrtha is a butterfly in the family Lycaenidae. It was described by Otto Staudinger in 1889. It is found in the Indomalayan  realm where it is endemic to Palawan.

References

External links
Arhopala Boisduval, 1832 at Markku Savela's Lepidoptera and Some Other Life Forms. Retrieved June 3, 2017.

Arhopala
Butterflies described in 1889